Automobiles Grégoire was a French manufacturer of cars and aero engines, established in 1902, that operated for about 20 years in the early 20th century. The company grew from an earlier enterprise making engines under the name "Cyclone", established in 1899 by Louis Soncin, in Poissy, but was largely the creation of Pierre Joseph Grégoire (1876 - 1962).

Cars 
At the factory on the Boulevard Devaux in Poissy, Grégoire started off by manufacturing engines in 1903, but in 1904, the company started to manufacture automobiles. The design was easily recognisable by its pear-shaped radiator. The company made cars with single-, two- and four-cylinder engines. In 1911, a six-cylinder and a four-cylinder sleeve-valve engine were also produced. The Grégoire company never sold many automobiles. In 1913, only 500 cars were made.

After World War I, Grégoire introduced its first car with an overhead-valve engine. The manufacture of this model was expensive, and it had disappointing financial results. In 1923, Grégoire only produced engines for the Bignan company. Grégoire closed its factory down in 1924.

Aero engines 
At the 1902 Salon aéronautique, Grégoire offered engines for airships. From these, the company evolved towards aircraft engines- "Moteurs d'Aviation Grégoire-Gyp"- made at Suresnes. The initials of Pierre J. Grégoire (G.Y.P.) provided the name for these engines. They were built in various configurations, and in four variants by power and weight, from 25/30 cv, 60 kg, to 120/140 cv, 240 kg.

External links 
Gazoline, Grégoire information (In French) -
GREGOIRE L'autre constructeur de Poissy... 15/05/2010, mini.43.free.fr/gregoire
Home page for enthusiasts amicalegregoire.net
LES VOITURES GREGOIRE- PRODUCTION AUTOMOBILES "GREGOIRE" - 1904 / 1923  amicalegregoire.net
LES AVIONS GREGOIRE amicalegregoire.net
L'HISTOIRE DE LA MARQUE amicalegregoire.net

Car brands
Defunct motor vehicle manufacturers of France
Poissy
Vehicle manufacturing companies established in 1903
French companies established in 1903